Iraj Arab is an Iranian sports executive and administrator who has been serving as president of the Persepolis Football Club. Arab was previously working as deputy chief of the Persepolis administrative and financial affairs, In December 2018, he replaced HamidReza Garshasbi.

In 18 June 2019, Persepolis supporters protests against Iraj Arab and managing board, Because of possibility of ending cooperation with Branko Ivanković.

References

External links 

 Ministry of Sport and Youth of Iran, Iraj Arab (Fa)

Living people
Association football executives
Iranian sports executives and administrators
Year of birth missing (living people)